Thomas Owen (1840-1898) was a British Liberal politician who represented Launceston, Cornwall in the House of Commons from 1892 to 1898.

References

External links 
 Hansard

1840 births
1898 deaths
Members of the Parliament of the United Kingdom for Launceston
Politicians from Cornwall
UK MPs 1892–1895
UK MPs 1895–1900
Liberal Party (UK) MPs for English constituencies
19th-century English politicians